The Saskatchewan Association of Rural Municipalities, often abbreviated as SARM, is an independent association that is responsible for representing the governments of the many rural municipalities in the Canadian province of Saskatchewan. It is an official Government of Saskatchewan sanctioned corporation. There are 296 rural municipalities represented by SARM in such areas as dealing with the provincial and federal governments. The members are arranged in divisions in order to elect SARM Directors.

Board of Directors of Divisions 

SARM is governed by a board of directors. There are eight people on the board of directors: the president, the vice-president, and one director from each SARM division. All board members must be elected rural municipal officials from their local municipality. The President of the Rural Municipal Administrators Association (RMAA) also sits on the board as an Ex-Officio member. The board of directors includes, as of October 2021:
President- Ray Orb
Vice-President- William Huber
 Division 1 - South East - Bob Moulding
 Division 2 - South Central- Norm Nordgulen
 Division 3 - South West- Larry Grant
 Division 4 - North East- Harvey Malanowich
 Division 5 - North Central-Judy Hardwood
 Division 6 - North West- Darwin Whitfield
 Ex-Officio - Guy Lagrandeur

See also

 Politics of Saskatchewan

Notes

References 
About SARM 
SARM Board of Directors
SARM Members

Geographic regions of Saskatchewan